ASC Trarza Nadi Sporting is a Mauritanean football club based in Rosso, the capital of the Trarza region. 
The club plays in the Mauritanean Premier League.

Stadium
Currently the team plays at the 1000 capacity Stade Trarza.

Honours
Coupe du Président de la République
Winner (2): 1982, 1984

References

External links
Team profile - maurifoot.net
Team profile - soccerway.com

Football clubs in Mauritania